This is a list of characters in Sea Patrol, an Australian TV series.

Current major characters

Mike "CO" Flynn 
Lieutenant Commander Mike Flynn -- ("CO") -- is the Hammersley's Commanding Officer ("CO"), and one of the two principal characters of the series, present from beginning to end. Played by Ian Stenlake.

Kate "XO" McGregor 
Lieutenant Kate McGregor -- ("XO") -- is the Hammersley's Executive Officer ("XO") (second-in-command), and one of the two principal characters of the series, present from beginning to end. Played by Lisa McCune.

Andy "Charge" Thorpe 

Chief Petty Officer Andrew "Charge" Thorpe MBA is a fictional TV character on the show Sea Patrol. He is portrayed by John Batchelor.  On HMAS Hammersley, Charge is the chief engineer. Swain tells us that Charge is a 41-year-old male in the episode "Dogs of war". He has a son, named Jamie, who is a midshipman in the navy.  His awards in order of precedence are as follows:

He ultimately leaves the navy and becomes a mining engineer in Western Australia

Chris "Swain" Blake 
Petty Officer Chris Blake -- ("Swain") --  is the ship's coxswain/medic, and often the softening influence on various situations, and is present throughout the entire series. Played by Matt Holmes.

Robert "RO" Dixon 

Leading Seaman Robert Dixon is a fictional TV character on the show Sea Patrol. He is portrayed by Kristian Schmid.  Robert Dixon (also RO) is the radio operator on board HMAS Hammersley.  RO usually makes pessimistic predictions about the events that take place in and around the Hammersley. He is known for his vast knowledge on foreign languages, his strange ability to keep calm and a straight-face at all times and his annoyance at almost everybody.  His awards in order of precedence are as follows:

Rebecca "Bomber" Brown

Leo "2-Dads" Kosov-Meyer

Dylan "Dutchy" Mulholland

Jessica "Bird" Bird 

Jessica 'Gap Girl' Bird is a fictional television character portrayed by Danielle Horvat. She replaced Billy "Spider" Webb doing his Boatswain's Mate duties onboard HMAS Hammersley while doing her Gap Year in the RAN. Her first appearance was the first episode of Season 4.  Jessica Bird is a young Navy sailor on HMAS Hammersley, after finishing high school she decided to sign up for a gap year on Navy patrol boat. Dutchy and the crew keep her under their wings. Bird is a favourite of the crew on whom to play pranks – particularly by 2Dads (Kosov-Meyer). In series five, Bird becomes Hammersley's chef after Bomber leaves Hammersley after her affair with 2Dads.

Maxine "Knocker" White 
Commander Maxine "Knocker" White, played by Tammy MacIntosh in Series 4 and 5, is the shore-based Squadron Commander, over HMAS and some other patrol craft in her area of command.  She is the immediate superior to HMAS Hammersley's Commanding Officer ("CO") Mike Flynn—and had a brief affair with him early in their careers. Later it is revealed that Mike is the father of her son Ryan, not her ex-husband, Stewart White. She and Mike briefly rekindle their relationship in season 5, but it does not last long.

Ryan White 
Midshipman Ryan White, a naval cadet, played by Dominic Deutscher, takes his orientation cruise aboard HMAS Hammersley—apparently by the arrangement of his mother, the Hammersley's Squadron Commander, Commander Maxine 'Knocker' White, who has a past with the CO.  Ryan is apparently her son by her ex-husband (Stewart White), the relationship between Ryan and CO Flynn grows increasingly complex and serious as the final season progresses, and ends dramatically.  Along the way, Ryan's adventures and crew relations are complicated by his semi-official standing as crew, by his internal coming-of-age crises, and his past, particularly by his relationship to the boatswain/chef, Jessica 'Gap Girl' Bird, with whom he was attempting to pursue for a relationship before his assignment to Hammersley.

Former major characters
Nikki "Nav" Caetano 
Pete "Buffer" Tomaszewski
Josh "ET" Holiday
Billy "Spider" Webb
Toby "Chefo" Jones

References 

 
Lists of Australian television series characters